United Nations Security Council resolution 919, adopted unanimously on 25 May 1994, after recalling all resolutions on South Africa, in particular resolutions 282 (1970), 418 (1977), 421 (1977), 558 (1984) and 591 (1986), the Council welcomed the recent general elections and new government and decided, under Chapter VII of the United Nations Charter, to terminate the arms embargo and all other restrictions against South Africa.

Measures imposed in other resolutions would also be ended. The Committee of the Security Council established in Resolution 421 was also dissolved.

Thabo Mbeki, Deputy President of South Africa, welcomed the lifting of restrictions, stating that they were "acceptance by the world body that we (South Africa) have become a democratic country".

See also
 Academic boycott of South Africa
 Disinvestment from South Africa
 Foreign relations of apartheid South Africa
 List of United Nations Security Council Resolutions 901 to 1000 (1994–1995)
 Negotiations to end apartheid in South Africa
 Apartheid
 Sporting boycott of South Africa

References

External links
 
Text of the Resolution at undocs.org

 0919
United Nations Security Council Resolution 919
 0919
United Nations Security Council sanctions regimes
May 1994 events